Sandeep Mathrani (born 1962) is an Indian-American real estate executive, and the chief executive officer (CEO) and chairman of WeWork. Most recently, he was CEO of Brookfield Properties' Retail Group and vice chairman of Brookfield Properties (from 2018 to 2020). Prior to that, he was CEO of GGP for eight years until it was sold to Brookfield in August 2018.

Early life and education 

Mathrani was born and raised in Mumbai, India. He went to high school at Cathedral and John Connon School. He emigrated to Philadelphia in the United States alone at the age of 16. In 1983, he graduated from college at the Stevens Institute of Technology in Hoboken, New Jersey, obtaining his bachelor's degree in engineering. In 1986, he obtained his master's degree in Management Science from Stevens. He was mentored by three real estate giants: Bruce Flatt, Bruce Ratner  and Steven Roth.

Business career 

Mathrani began as the CEO of GGP Inc. in 2011, just as the company was emerging from Chapter 11 bankruptcy. He was hired away from his previous job as an executive with Vornado Realty Trust, the company owned by his mentor. He was CEO until 2018, when it was purchased by Brookfield Property Partners. After the acquisition, Mathrani joined Brookfield as the chief executive of its retail property management arm.

In February 2020, Mathrani was brought on board as the new CEO of real estate company WeWork, following the ouster of its CEO Adam Neumann and the collapse of its IPO.

See also 
 Indians in the New York City metropolitan region

References 

American chief executives
American technology executives
21st-century American businesspeople
Living people
Indian emigrants to the United States
Stevens Institute of Technology alumni
1962 births
WeWork people
American people of Gujarati descent